Howard Roger Garis ( – ) was an American author, best known for a series of books that featured the character of Uncle Wiggily Longears, an engaging elderly rabbit. Many of his books were illustrated by Lansing Campbell. Garis and his wife, Lilian Garis, were possibly the most prolific children's authors of the early 20th century.

Biography 
Garis was born in Binghamton, New York. He and his spouse Lilian Garis both worked as reporters for the Newark Evening News. He did some work on the side for WNJR also in Newark.

Uncle Wiggily
The first Uncle Wiggily story appeared January 10, 1910, in the Newark News. For almost four decades the newspaper published an Uncle Wiggily story by Garis every day except Sunday, and the series was eventually nationally syndicated. By the time Garis retired from the newspaper in 1947, he had written more than 11,000 Uncle Wiggily stories.

By virtue of his accessible characters and engaging plots, Garis was one of the most influential children's authors of his day. Many of his books, especially the Uncle Wiggily books, are still widely read and are readily available over the internet. Milton Bradley produced an Uncle Wiggily board game in 1916, 1947, 1954, again in 1967, and again in 1988. The game debuted much earlier though and remained popular until the 1970s.

Stratemeyer Syndicate
Garis wrote many books for the Stratemeyer Syndicate under various pseudonyms. As Victor Appleton, he wrote about the enterprising Tom Swift; as Laura Lee Hope, he is generally credited with writing volumes 4–28 and 41 of the Bobbsey Twins; as Clarence Young, the Motor Boys series; as Lester Chadwick, the Baseball Joe series; and as Marion Davidson, a number of books including several featuring the Camp Fire Girls. The couple's children also wrote for Stratemeyer.

After Edward Stratemeyer's death in May 1930, his two daughters, Harriet Stratemeyer Adams (1892–1982) and Edna C. Squier (1895–1974), ran the company, with the result that Garis stopped writing for the Syndicate in 1933 after several disagreements.

Death 
Garis moved to Amherst, Massachusetts in 1950, and died there in 1962.

Biographies
Garis' son, Roger Garis, penned a biography of the writing Garis family My Father Was Uncle Wiggily (McGraw-Hill, 1966), as well as writing several books under his own name and pseudonyms, including a four-volume series of children's adventures/mysteries for A. L. Burt.  His daughter, Cleo F. also wrote a three-volume series of children's mysteries, published by A. L. Burt. His granddaughter, Leslie Garis, wrote a more revealing Garis family memoir, The House of Happy Endings (Farrar, Straus and Giroux, 2007).

Bibliography

Titles written under Garis's name
 With Force and Arms, J. S. Ogilvie Publishing Company, 1902
 The King of Unadilla, J. S. Ogilvie Publishing Company, 1903
 The White Crystals, Little, Brown and Company, 1904
 Isle of Black Fire, J. B. Lippincott Company, 1904
 Tam of the Fire Cave, D. Appleton and Company, 1927
 Tuftoo the Clown, D. Appleton and Company, 1928
 Chad of Knob Hill, Little, Brown and Company, 1929

The Mystery Boys series (two separate series, both by Garis) 
Written under Howard R. Garis, and published by Bradley
 Mystery Boys in Ghost Canyon, 1930
 Mystery Boys at Round Lake, 1931

Written under the pen name Van Powell, and first published by A. L. Burt
 The Mystery Boys and the Inca Gold, 1931
 The Mystery Boys and Captain Kidd's Message, 1931
 The Mystery Boys and the Secret of the Golden Sun, 1931
 The Mystery Boys and the Chinese Jewels, 1931
 The Mystery Boys and the Hindu Treasure, 1931

The Daddy series (selected)
 Daddy Takes Us Camping, 1914
 Daddy Takes Us Fishing, 1914
 Daddy Takes Us to the Circus, 1914
 Daddy Takes Us Skating, 1914
 Daddy Takes Us Coasting, 1914
 Daddy Takes Us to the Farm, 1918 (?)
 Daddy Takes Us to the Garden, 1914
 Daddy Takes Us Hunting Flowers, 1915
 Daddy Takes Us Hunting Birds, 1916
 Daddy Takes Us to the Woods, 1917

The Baseball Joe Series
Written under the pen name Lester Chadwick
 Baseball Joe of the Silver Stars
 Baseball Joe on the School Nine
 Baseball Joe at Yale
 Baseball Joe in the Central League
 Baseball Joe in the Big League
 Baseball Joe on the Giants
 Baseball Joe in the World Series
 Baseball Joe Around the World
 Baseball Joe: Home Run King
 Baseball Joe Saving the League
 Baseball Joe Captain of the Team
 Baseball Joe Champion of the League
 Baseball Joe Club Owner
 Baseball Joe Pitching Wizard

Two Wild Cherries series / The Dick and Janet Cherry Series
Originally released as Two Wild Cherries; re-released as The Dick and Janet Cherry series; as Howard R. Garis
 Two Wild Cherries; or, How Dick and Janet Lost Something
 Two Wild Cherries In The Country; or, How Dick and Janet Saved The Mill
 Two Wild Cherries At The Seashore; or, How Dick and Janet Were Shipwrecked
 Two Wild Cherries in the Woods; or, How Dick and Janet Caught the Bear

(This series later released under alternative titles by McLoughlin, and book order changed)

Rick and Ruddy series
as Howard R. Garis
 Rick and Ruddy, 1920
 Rick and Ruddy in Camp, 1921
 Rick and Ruddy Afloat, 1922
 Rick and Ruddy Out West, 1923
 Rick and Ruddy on the Trail, 1924

(This series later released under alternative titles by McLoughlin)

Those Smith Boys series
as Howard R. Garis

 Those Smith Boys, 1910
 Those Smith Boys on the Diamond, 1912

The Venture Boys series
as Howard R. Garis
 The Venture Boys Afloat, 1917
 The Venture Boys in Camp, 1918

Larry Dexter Series
as by Howard R. Garis

 From Office Boy to Reporter 1907 
 Larry Dexter, Reporter, 1907
 Larry Dexter's Great Search, 1909
 Larry Dexter and the Bank Mystery, 1912
 Larry Dexter and the Stolen Boy, 1912
 Larry Dexter in Belgium, 1915
 Larry Dexter and the Ward Diamonds, 1927
 Larry Dexter's Great Chase, 1927

Volumes 1 and 2 initially published by Chatterton-Peck.
Volumes 1 through 6 issued by Grosset & Dunlap.
Volumes 6 and 7 issued by Garden City Publishing (in paperback only)

Volume 1 through 6 retitled and issued by George Sully as the Young Reporter Series circa 1918.
 The Young Reporter at the Big Flood
 The Young Reporter and the Land Swindlers
 The Young Reporter and the Missing Millionaire
 The Young Reporter and the Bank Mystery
 The Young Reporter and the Stolen Boy
 The Young Reporter at the Battle Front

Three Little Trippertrots series
as Howard R. Garis. Published by Graham & Matlack, New York. Compilations of stories originally read over the New Jersey Telephone Herald entertainment service.

Three Little Trippertrots, 1912
Three Little Trippertrots And Their Travels, 1912

Tom Cardiff series
as Howard R. Garis

Tom Cardiff's Circus (1926) (reprinted in USSR as Том Кардиф в Цирке) (1930)
Tom Cardiff in the Big Top (1927)

Circus Animal stories
Published by R. F. Fenno
Snarlie the Tiger, 1916
Woo-Uff The Lion, 1917
Umboo the Elephant, 1918

Bed Time series
This series of children's books was written by Garis beginning in 1910. Each volume contains 31 stories, one for each day of the month:
 Sammie and Susie Littletail
 Johnny and Billy Bushytail
 Lulu, Alice & Jimmie Wibble-Wobble
 Jackie and Peetie Bow-Wow
 Buddy and Brighteyes Pigg
 Joie, Tommie and Kittie Kat
 Charlie and Arabella Chick
 Neddie and Beckie Stubtail
 Bully and Bawly No-Tail
 Nannie and Billie Wagtail
 Jollie and Jillie Longtail
 Jacko and Jumpo Kinkytail
 Curly and Floppy Twistytail
 Toodle and Noodle Flat-Tail
 Dottie and Willie Flufftail
 Dickie and Nellie Fliptail
 Woodie and Waddie Chuck
 Bobby and Betty Ringtail

The Curlytops series
as Howard R. Garis; Published by Cupples & Leon, illustrated by Julia Greene
 At Cherry Farm; or, Vacation Days in the Country, 1918.
 On Star Island; or, Camping Out with Grandpa, 1918.
 Snowed In; or, Grand Fun with Skates and Sleds, 1918.
 At Uncle Frank's Ranch; or, Little Folks on Ponyback, 1918. Cupples & Leon.
 At Silver Lake; or, On the Water with Uncle Ben, 1920.
 And Their Pets; or, Uncle Toby's Strange Collection, 1921.
 And Their Playmates; or, Jolly Times Through the Holidays, 1922.
 In the Woods; or, Fun at the Lumber Camp, 1923.
 At Sunset Beach; or, What Was Found in the Sand, 1924.
 Touring Around; or, The Missing Photograph Album, 1925.
 In a Summer Camp; or, Animal Joe's Menagerie, 1927.
 Growing Up; or, Winter Sports and Summer Pleasures, 1928.
 At Happy House; or, The Mystery of the Chinese Vase, 1931.
 At the Circus; or, The Runaway Elephant, 1932.

Buddy series
as Howard R. Garis.
Cupples & Leon published this series about the adventures of Buddy Martyne with his family and friends:
  Buddy on the Farm or, a Boy and his Prize Pumpkin, 1929
  Buddy in School, or, a Boy and his Dog, 1929
  Buddy and his Winter Fun, or, a Boy in a Snow Camp, 1929
  Buddy at Rainbow Lake, or, a Boy and his Boat, 1930
 Buddy and his Chum, or, a Boy’s Queer Search, 1930
 Buddy at Pine Beach, or, a Boy on the Ocean, 1931
 Buddy and his Flying Balloon, or, a Boy’s Mysterious Airship, 1931
 Buddy on Mystery Mountain or, a Boy’s Strange Discovery, 1932
 Buddy on Floating Island or, a Boy’s Wonderful Secret, 1933
 Buddy and the Secret Cave or, a Boy and the Crystal Hermit, 1934
 Buddy and his Cowboy Pal or, a Boy on a Ranch, 1935
 Buddy and the Indian Chief or, a Boy among the Navajos, 1936
 Buddy and the Arrow Club or, a Boy and the Long Bow, 1937
 Buddy at Lost River or, a Boy and a Gold Mine, 1938
 Buddy on the Trail or, a Boy Among the Gypsies, 1939
 Buddy in Deep Valley or, a Boy on a Bee Farm, 1940
 Buddy at Red Gate or, a Boy on a Chicken Farm, 1941
 Buddy in Dragon Swamp or, a Boy on a Strange Hunt, 1942,
 Buddy’s Victory Club or, a Boy and a Salvage Campaign, 1943
 Buddy and the G-Man Mystery or, a Boy and a Strange Cipher, 1944
 Buddy and his Fresh Air Camp or, a Boy and the Unlucky Ones, 1947

Rocket Riders series
as Howard R. Garis
 Rocket Riders Across The Ice or Racing Against Time, 1933
 Rocket Riders Over the Desert or, Seeking the Lost City, 1933
 Rocket Riders in Stormy Seas or, Trailing the Treasure Divers, 1933
 Rocket Riders in The Air or, A Chase in the Clouds, 1934

Teddy series
as Howard R. Garis
 Teddy and The Mystery Monkey, 1936
 Teddy and The Mystery Dog, 1936
 Teddy and The Mystery Cat, 1937
 Teddy and The Mystery Parrot, 1938
 Teddy and The Mystery Pony, 1939
 Teddy and His Mystery Deer, 1940
 Teddy and His Mystery Goat, 1941

Uncle Wiggily series
as Howard R. Garis
 Uncle Wiggily's Adventures
 Uncle Wiggily's Travels
 Uncle Wiggily's Fortune
 Uncle Wiggily's Automobile
 Uncle Wiggily at the Seashore
 Uncle Wiggily's Airship
 Uncle Wiggily in the Country
 Uncle Wiggily in the Woods
 Uncle Wiggily on the Farm
 Uncle Wiggily's Journey
 Uncle Wiggily and Baby Bunty
 Uncle Wiggily's Story Book
 Uncle Wiggily's Picture Book
 Uncle Wiggily's Puzzle Book
 Uncle Wiggily on Sugar Island
 The Uncle Wiggily Book
 Uncle Wiggily's Bungalow
 Uncle Wiggily's Picnic Party
 Uncle Wiggily’s Surprises
 Uncle Wiggily's Happy Days
 Uncle Wiggily and The Canoe
 Uncle Wiggily and the Littletails
 Uncle Wiggily in Wonderland, 1921
 Uncle Wiggily and Old Mother Hubbard, 1922

Happy Home series
The Happy Home Series is a six-volume series of children's books written by Garis between 1926 and 1927:
 Adventures of the Galloping Gas Stove
 Adventures of the Runaway Rocking Chair
 Adventures of the Traveling Table
 Adventures of the Sliding Foot Stool
 Adventures of the Sailing Sofa
 Adventures of the Prancing Piano

References

External links

 
 
 
 
 
 
 
 
 
 
 Works by Howard R. Garis at Esprios (Free to download titles)

1873 births
1962 deaths
American children's writers
Stratemeyer Syndicate
Writers from Binghamton, New York
20th-century American writers
20th-century American male writers